Otto Schläpfer (March 11, 1931 – 2015) was a Swiss ice hockey player who played for the Switzerland men's national ice hockey team at the 1952 and 1956 Olympics. He also played for the Zürcher SC.

External links
Otto Schläpfer's profile at Sports-Reference.com
Mention of Otto Schläpfer's death

1931 births
2015 deaths
Ice hockey players at the 1952 Winter Olympics
Ice hockey players at the 1956 Winter Olympics
Olympic ice hockey players of Switzerland
Swiss ice hockey centres
ZSC Lions players